WAGE (91.1 FM) was a non-profit American radio station broadcasting a Christian radio format. The station was licensed by the Federal Communications Commission (FCC) to serve the community of Dogwood Lakes Estate, Florida.

The station was licensed to Florida Panhandle Technical College in Chipley, and operated by the Bethany Divinity College & Seminary of Dothan, Alabama. The programming focus of the station was Southern Gospel music, as a satellite of Bethany Divinity's WVOB in Dothan.

WAGE's license was cancelled by the FCC on March 31, 2015, due to having been silent for more than twelve months (since sometime in 2012).

References

External links

Radio stations established in 1983
Defunct radio stations in the United States
Radio stations disestablished in 2015
Defunct religious radio stations in the United States
1983 establishments in Florida
2015 disestablishments in Florida
AGE